Companies of the United States with untaxed profits deals with those U.S. companies whose offshore subsidiaries earn profits which are retained in foreign countries to defer paying U.S. corporate tax. The profits of United States corporations are subject to a federal corporate tax rate of 21%. In principle, the tax is payable on all profits of corporations, whether earned domestically or abroad. However, overseas subsidiaries of U.S. corporations are entitled to a tax deferral of profits on active income until repatriated to the U.S., and are regarded as untaxed. When repatriated, the corporations are entitled to a foreign tax credit for taxes (if any) paid in foreign countries.

Retaining such profits offshore may be regarded as a tax strategy. Many corporations have accumulated substantial untaxed profits offshore, especially in countries with low corporate tax rates. In recent years it has been estimated that untaxed profits range from US$1.6 to $2.1 trillion. The Wall Street Journal noted that the "[u]ntaxed foreign earnings are part of a contentious debate over U.S. fiscal policy and tax code." The profits earned abroad and retained there are subject to a foreign exchange risk, besides other financial risks.

The downside of a strategy of retaining profits offshore is that corporations may want or need to pay dividends to shareholders, or to make investments in the United States, besides other reasons. The alternative may be to borrow funds in the U.S., or access the funds retained offshore in the form of inter-company loans.

The Tax Cuts and Jobs Act of 2017 (TCJA) imposed a one time tax on these offshore profits at 8% (non-cash) and 15.5% (cash) respectively.  The Act also includes a provision that taxes all foreign profits in the US in the year they are earned ending the ability of US companies to defer paying US tax on unrepatriated earnings.

Magnitude
A number of studies have estimated the untaxed overseas profits to be from US$1.6 to $2.1 trillion. A 2011 study by JPMorgan Chase & Co. identified $1.375 trillion in undistributed foreign earnings.  A Wall Street Journal analysis in 2012 found that the amounts for 60 large firms grew by $166 billion in the preceding year, shielding 40% of their earnings. In 2012, a Bloomberg study found $1 trillion held overseas for 70 U.S.-based multi-national companies, using public annual reports for years ending in 2010 and 2011, and it estimated an overall total of $1.6 trillion. In 2013, a private research firm study asserted there were more than $2.1 trillion of U.S. corporate profits untaxed in 2013. In 2016, the Institute on Taxation and Economic Policy, estimates $2.6 trillion held offshore and  two-thirds of that is held by 30 U.S. companies, with Apple, Pfizer, and Microsoft being the top three (see chart).

Foreign profits were up 93% from 2008 to 2013.

Politics and tax policy issues
It has been suggested that companies hold profits overseas hoping for a tax holiday. In 2012 Northwestern University law professor Thomas Brennan asserted that "companies are holding money outside the U.S. in part because they are waiting for Congress to repeat a 2004 tax holiday law that set a maximum tax rate for repatriation profits of 5.25%. 'Why not do it?' he said. 'It’s pure upside. In the worst-case scenario, you’re going to be taxed as you would have been in any event.'" The 2004 tax holiday, under President George W. Bush, yielded a lot of repatriation but not much economic benefit, according to one view.  A number of the large U.S.-based companies that would benefit, including Google, Cisco Systems Inc., Qualcomm Inc. and Oracle Corp., were lobbying during 2011-2012 to obtain a repatriation holiday. At the time, however, President Obama was believed to oppose a one-time tax holiday, as it would be a giveaway to big corporations.

President Obama's February 2015 budget proposal called for a 14% tax to be applied on untaxed overseas profits, indicating that the proposal would yield $238 billion, implying a $1.7 trillion estimate of untaxed profits. It was proposed as a one-time tax to be imposed whether or not funds are repatriated. The proposal has not been heard about since.

In 2015, the topic of U.S. taxation of companies' operations abroad was addressed by several potential U.S. presidential candidates. For example, Republican senators Marco Rubio and Mike Lee have called for elimination of U.S. taxes on companies' operations abroad, within a broader proposal for corporate and individual tax rate changes.

Comparative tax rates

Corporate tax rates vary between tax jurisdictions. The national rates of Organisation for Economic Co-operation and Development (OECD) countries vary from a low of 8.5% in Switzerland to a high of 35% in the United States, with an average of 22%. In addition to the federal tax rates, provincial, state and local taxes may also apply in most jurisdictions. For example, the 2015 provincial corporate tax rates in Canada range from 11.5% to 16% in addition to the federal tax rate of 15%, unless taxable profits of small corporations are low enough to qualify for a lower tax rate.

In comparing national corporate tax rates one should also take into account the taxes on dividends paid to shareholders. For example, the overall U.S. tax on corporate profits of 35% is less than or similar to that of European countries such as Germany, Ireland, Switzerland and the United Kingdom, which have lower corporate tax rates but higher taxes on dividends paid to shareholders.

Many large multinational companies retain untaxed profits in tax haven jurisdictions which offer no or very low corporate taxes, as well as other tax benefits.

List of companies with untaxed profits 
Large U.S. multinational companies which are known to have significant untaxed profits include:

General Electric, $110 billion profits abroad (as of 2013)
Microsoft, $76.4 billion (2013)
Pfizer, $69 billion (2013). On 23 November 2015, Pfizer and Irish company Allergan announced their intention to merge for an approximate sum of $160 billion making this the largest pharmaceutical deal ever, and the third largest merger in history. The terms of the merger propose that the merged company will maintain Allergan's Irish domicile, resulting in the new company being subject to corporation tax at the Irish rate of 12.5%.
Merck & Co, $57.1 billion (2013)
Apple, $252 billion (2018)

Google 
Medtronic
Abbott Labs, had $40 billion (as of 2011)
Johnson & Johnson, had $14.8 billion (as of 2012)
Honeywell

See also
 Tax inversion
 Microsoft Corp. v. Internal Revenue Service
 Repatriation tax holiday

References 

Corporate taxation in the United States
Tax avoidance in the United States
taxation
Corporate tax avoidance
Offshore finance